Tanya Tuzova (Russian: Тáня (Татьяна) Тýзова, born December 8, 1993) is a Russian artist, singer, model, designer and blogger. She is known for her deliberate resemblance to a Barbie doll, for which she received the nickname "Russian Barbie".

Born in Kazan into a family of musicians, Tuzova got her first doll at the age of 12. From that point onwards, she decided to become like Barbie, imitating her clothes and collecting a number of Barbie dolls. She has been married five times.

In 2020 the total amount of dolls reached to 9000.

She underwent breast surgery after giving birth to her son in the late 2000s, saying "[the situation] was awful after pregnancy and I had to have it fixed".

See also
Rodrigo Alves - The man doll Ken

References

1993 births
Living people
21st-century Russian women singers
21st-century Russian singers